Kassbach – Ein Porträt is a 1979 Austrian drama film directed by Peter Patzak.

Walter Kohut plays the title role. Kohut embodies "the eponymous neo-Nazi 'hero,' a Viennese philistine and petit bourgeois par excellence borne of dull racism." The story is based on the novel "Kassbach oder das allgemeine Interesse am Meerschweinchen" (Kassbach or the General Interest in Guinea Pigs) by Helmut Zenker, who had also been involved in the screenplay.

The film was entered into the 29th Berlin International Film Festival.

Cast
 Walter Kohut - Karl Kassbach
 Immy Schell - Kassbach's wife
 Konrad Becker - Kassbach's son
 Walter Davy - Head of the Initiative
 Franz Buchrieser - Kassbach's friend
 Hanno Pöschl - Kassbach's friend
 Heinz Petters - Post office clerk
 Ulrich Baumgartner - Anwerber
 Erni Mangold - Liesi's mother
 Maria Engelstorfer - Kassbach's mother
 Heinrich Strobele - Kassbach's colleague

References

External links

1979 films
1979 drama films
1970s German-language films
Austrian drama films
Films directed by Peter Patzak